Felipe Pereira Tavares (born 24 February 1994) is a Brazilian footballer who currently plays for FC Ryukyu.

Career statistics

Club

Notes

References

External links

1994 births
Living people
Brazilian footballers
Brazilian expatriate footballers
Association football defenders
J2 League players
Clube Atlético Linense players
Duque de Caxias Futebol Clube players
Associação Esportiva Santacruzense players
Rio Branco Esporte Clube players
Associação Esportiva Velo Clube Rioclarense players
Associação Atlética Anapolina players
Mirassol Futebol Clube players
Olímpia Futebol Clube players
Sociedade Esportiva do Gama players
Anápolis Futebol Clube players
FC Ryukyu players
Expatriate footballers in Japan
Brazilian expatriate sportspeople in Japan
Footballers from São Paulo